Terasaka Yakuro Masatsune (赤坂 弥九郎 政雅, 1567–1594) was a direct student of Kaneko Shinkuro Morisada the second headmaster of the Tenshinsho Jigen Ryu. Terasaka is better known by his Buddhist dharma name- Zenkitsu (善吉, also read Zenkichi). He was the chief priest at the Buddhist temple Tenneiji of the Soto Zen School not far from Kuramadera near Kyoto.

Zenkitsu later succeeded Kaneko in becoming the third headmaster (soke) of the Tenshinsho Jigen Ryu. His best student was a samurai from the Satsuma domain, Togo Shigekata, whom he taught between 1588-1589. In less than a year Shigekata would master the Tenshinsho Jigen Ryu and synthesize it with the Taisha Ryu to create the Jigen Ryu.

Zenkitsu died in c. 1594.

References

Japanese martial artists
Japanese swordfighters
Samurai
1567 births
1594 deaths